Captain George Carpenter Whitely (November 7, 1874 – December 1, 1961) was a ship's captain and politician in Newfoundland. He represented St. Barbe in the Newfoundland House of Assembly from 1932 to 1934 as a United Newfoundland Party member.

The son of W. H. Whitely and Louisa Thompson, he was born in St. John's and was educated at the Methodist College and at Saint Bonaventure's College. He began sealing in 1890 and became master of the schooner Poppy in 1898, going on to captain several other ships. He was also involved in the management of the family business based in Bonne-Espérance, Quebec. He was elected to the Newfoundland assembly in 1932. He ran unsuccessfully to represent St. Barbe at the Newfoundland National Convention of 1946. Whitely served as chairman of the International Grenfell Association for a number of years.

He married Mary T. Canning. Whitely died in St. John's at the age of 87.

References 

1874 births
1961 deaths
United Newfoundland Party MHAs
Sea captains